Pleasantville is the name of three places in the U.S. state of Pennsylvania:

Pleasantville, Bedford County, Pennsylvania
Pleasantville, Berks County, Pennsylvania
Pleasantville, Venango County, Pennsylvania

nl:Pleasantville (Pennsylvania)